Brazil competed at the 2022 Winter Paralympics in Beijing, China which took place between 4–13 March 2022.

Competitors
The following is the list of number of competitors participating at the Games per sport/discipline.

Cross-country skiing

Cristian Ribera was among the cross-country skiers to compete at the 2022 Winter Paralympics.

Snowboarding

One snowboarder competed in snowboarding.

Banked slalom

Snowboard cross

Qualification legend: Q - Qualify to next round; FA - Qualify to medal final; FB - Qualify to consolation final

See also
Brazil at the Paralympics
Brazil at the 2022 Winter Olympics

References

Nations at the 2022 Winter Paralympics
2022
Winter Paralympics